Liu Xin (born 11 June 1990) is a Chinese professional badminton singles player. Born in Benxi, Liaoning, her string of good performances during the 2010 and early 2011 helped her to attain the career-best ranking of 5 in April 2011. She was part of the Chinese team that won gold medals at the 2010 and 2014 World University Championships, and also at the 2014 Asian Games.

Achievements

Asian Championships 
Women's singles

World University Championships 
Women's singles

Women's doubles

BWF World Junior Championships 
Girls' singles

Asian Junior Championships 
Girls' singles

BWF Superseries 
The BWF Superseries, launched on 14 December 2006 and implemented in 2007, is a series of elite badminton tournaments, sanctioned by Badminton World Federation (BWF). BWF Superseries has two level such as Superseries and Superseries Premier. A season of Superseries features twelve tournaments around the world, which introduced since 2011, with successful players invited to the BWF Superseries Finals held at the year end.

Women's singles

  BWF Superseries Finals tournament
  BWF Superseries Premier tournament
  BWF Superseries tournament

BWF Grand Prix 
The BWF Grand Prix has two levels, the BWF Grand Prix and Grand Prix Gold. It is a series of badminton tournaments sanctioned by the Badminton World Federation (BWF) since 2007.

Women's singles

  BWF Grand Prix Gold tournament
  BWF Grand Prix tournament

BWF International Challenge/Series 
Women's singles

  BWF International Challenge tournament
  BWF International Series tournament

Record against selected opponents 
Record against year-end Finals finalists, World Championships semi-finalists, and Olympic quarter-finalists.

References 

1990 births
Living people
People from Benxi
Badminton players from Liaoning
Chinese female badminton players
Badminton players at the 2014 Asian Games
Asian Games gold medalists for China
Asian Games medalists in badminton
Medalists at the 2014 Asian Games